Tiny Tickers is a charitable organisation in Britain that aims to improve the early detection, diagnosis, and care of babies with congenital heart disease through a combination of improving standards, providing specialised training and increasing education and information.

Charity

The Tiny Tickers charity was founded in 1999 by a group of parents and medical professionals who had experience of, and were concerned about, the low prenatal detection rate of congenital heart defects(CHD). At that time, the published detection rate for CHD was 23% on average across the UK, with wide geographic variation (Bull K., Lancet, 1999).

Tiny Tickers aims to provide a better START for tiny hearts, through five key areas:
 Standards - to improve standards of care, using appropriately trained and qualified resources
 Training - to improve screening for CHD in hospitals, especially at the routine ultrasound anomaly scan
 Awareness - to inform the public and health professionals about congenital heart disease
 Research - to increase our understanding of prenatal congenital heart defects and the impact on quality of life
 Together - working with charities, professionals, businesses and supporters to make this a reality

Activities

Tiny Tickers aims:
 All women should be offered the opportunity to have their baby screened for heart problems during pregnancy
 This screening examination should detect most types of congenital heart defect
 There should be sufficient resources and trained specialists to care for babies with heart conditions and support families

If these goals are met, more babies with heart conditions would have a prenatal diagnosis, allowing families and doctors to be involved at an earlier stage and give these babies the chance of a better start in life.

Facts and figures

In 2002 Tiny Tickers funded a free hands-on, on-site training programme and piloted it in 12 hospitals. Based on positive feedback from the pilot, the training was extended throughout the UK.

In 2008, Tiny Tickers were asked to train all hospitals in Wales and in 2010, to train 3 regions in England.

In 2011, Tiny Tickers trained over 80 hospitals in England and Wales bringing the total trained to over 140 (or about 2/3rds of maternity hospitals).

References

External links
 Official website

Health charities in the United Kingdom
Heart disease organizations
Organizations established in 1999
1999 establishments in the United Kingdom